Romina Gupta is an American acrobatic gymnast and a former member of the USA National Gymnastics Team.

Career 
As a gymnast, Gupta won a gold medal at the 2015 World Artistic Gymnastics Championships, as well as silver medals in 2014 and 2013.

Personal life
Gupta is from Morgan Hill, California. She attended the Oakwood School, Morgan Hill and graduated from Mount Holyoke College. 

Gupta is Indian-American, of Bengali origin.

References

Living people
Year of birth missing (living people)
People from Morgan Hill, California
American acrobatic gymnasts
Sportspeople from California

Mount Holyoke College alumni
21st-century American women